Natura Artis Magistra (Latin for "Nature is the teacher of art"), commonly known just as Artis, is a zoo and botanical garden in the centre of Amsterdam. It is the oldest zoo in the Netherlands and fifth oldest zoo in the world.

In addition to the zoo, Artis also contains an aquarium, a planetarium, an arboretum, Micropia, and the Groote Museum. A part of the art collection is on display in the aquarium building of the zoo. Artis contains 27 historically significant (listed) buildings, bridges, and ponds, most of which are still used as animal enclosures.

History

The zoo was founded in 1838 by Gerard Westerman, J.W.H. Werlemann and J.J. Wijsmuller (also known as the three Ws). It was initially open only to members. Starting in 1851 it was opened to the public during the month of September. In 1920 it was opened year-round to the public, but September remains discount month.

The core of the current zoo property, then the "Middenhof" estate, was purchased by the board of the zoological society "Natura Artis Magistra" late in 1838 in the Plantage, which was then a rural area on the outskirts of Amsterdam. From the start it exhibited both live and mounted specimens.

The zoo is commonly referred to as Artis, because the zoo has three gates with the words 'Natura', 'Artis', and 'Magistra' written above each of them, respectively. More often than not, only the middle gate was open, so that people who walked through it, seeing that 'Artis' was written above it, believed that the zoo was just called Artis. Thanks to this, soon few people knew it by its full name: Natura Artis Magistra.

The last quagga in captivity died at Artis on 12 August 1883. At the time, because all zebras were referred to as quagga, nobody realized that this was the last quagga alive until years later.

Historic buildings

Artis includes 27 historic buildings. The aquarium was built in 1882 on land leased from the city on condition that only a museum ever be built on it. The library dates back to 1867 and the building the 'Ledenlokalen' on the right side of the main entrance dates back to the 19th century as well.

The wolf house (formerly an inn), and the Masman Garden House which now houses scarlet ibis were both on the site before the zoo was established.

Library

Artis has a library on the history of zoology and botany. It houses the library of the zoo, as well as the libraries of the Zoological Museum Amsterdam and the Amsterdam Botanical Garden. It also hosts the archives of a number of zoologists and botanists, such as the archive of Hugo de Vries.  It contains 20,000 books, 3000 manuscripts and 80,000 animal prints.

The library is part of the special collections of the University of Amsterdam.

Gallery

Notes

References

External links

1838 establishments in the Netherlands
Aquaria in Europe
Buildings and structures in Amsterdam
Museums in Amsterdam
Natural history museums in the Netherlands
Parks in Amsterdam
Planetaria in the Netherlands
Tourist attractions in Amsterdam
Zoos in the Netherlands